Rien is a village in Súdwest-Fryslân municipality in the province of Friesland, the Netherlands. It had a population of around 110  in January 2017.

History
The village was first mentioned in 1527 as Reensterzyl, and means "water border". Rien started as a satellite of Lytsewierrum near a sluice.

Rien was home to 321 people in 1840. It was award village status in 1954. Before 2018, the village was part of the Littenseradiel municipality and before 1984 it belonged to Hennaarderadeel municipality.

Gallery

References

External links

Súdwest-Fryslân
Populated places in Friesland